KMA-FM (99.1 FM) is a radio station broadcasting a talk radio format as a simulcast of KMA, Shenandoah, Iowa. Licensed to Clarinda, Iowa, United States, the station is currently owned by KMAland Broadcasting, LLC

History
What is today KMA-FM went on the air in 1977 on 106.3 MHz as KSWI. The first callsign reflected its initial owners, Southwest Iowa Stereo. Not long after signing on, however, Kendall Light, the station's owner, died. In 1979, the station was sold by Light's estate and became KQWI.

In 1989, KQWI moved to 106.1 MHz and was able to broadcast with 50,000 watts; by the fall of 1989, it began its first stint as KMA-FM. In 1995, the station, KKBZ with a hot adult contemporary format, was approved to move to 99.3, and the current 99.1 frequency was obtained in 2010.

References

External links

MA-FM
Talk radio stations in the United States
Page County, Iowa
Radio stations established in 1991
1991 establishments in Iowa